It's Low Beat Time is an album by the Americanrock band Young Fresh Fellows. It was released by Frontier Records in 1992. The album was produced in part by Butch Vig.

Critical reception

The Tampa Tribune wrote that "[Scott] McCaughey's brain gives his sharper songs resonating edges of meaning while avoiding lyrics that make much linear sense." The Seattle Times opined that "99 Girls" and "She Won't Budge" "rank with the greatest of classic Northwest rock."

Track listing
 Low Beat Jingle	
 Right Here
 Snow White
 Mr. Anthony's Last
 Whatever You Are
 Two Headed Flight
 A Minor Bird
 Faultless
 The Crafty Clerk
 Low Beat
 Love Is A Beautiful Thing
 She Sees Color
 Monkey Say
 99 Girls
 She Won't Budge
 Green Green

References

The Young Fresh Fellows albums
1992 albums
Albums produced by Conrad Uno